= Laura Ghisi =

Italian footballer (born 1998)

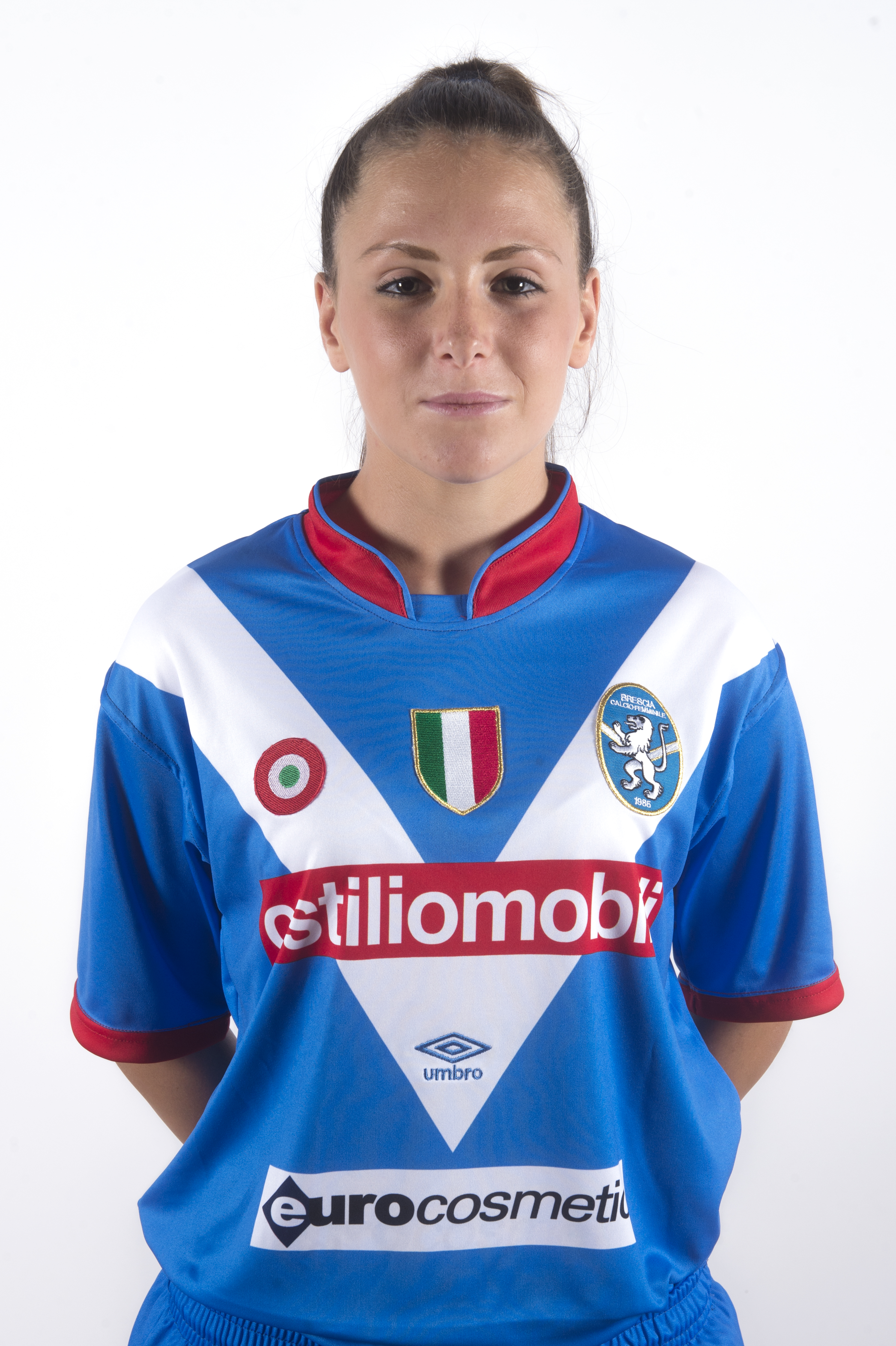

Personal information
- Date of birth: 25 July 1998 (age 28)
- Height: 1.55 m (5 ft 1 in)
- Position: Midfielder

Team information
- Current team: Brescia

Laura Ghisi is an Italian professional footballer who plays as a midfielder for Brescia.
